Kunigal Assembly constituency is one of the 224 Legislative Assembly constituencies of Karnataka state in India.

It is part of Tumkur district.

Members of the Legislative Assembly 
 1957: T. N. Mudlagirigowda, Indian National Congress
 1962: Andanaiah, Independent
 1967: G. Thammanna, Indian National Congress
 1972: Andanaiah, Indian National Congress
 1978: Andanaiah, Indian National Congress(I)
 1983: Y. K. Ramaiah, Janata Party
 1985: Y. K. Ramaiah, Janata Party
 1989: K. Lakkappa, Indian National Congress
 1994: S. P. Muddahanumegowda, Indian National Congress
 1999: S. P. Muddahanumegowda, Indian National Congress
 2004: Ningappa H, Janata Dal (Secular)
 2008: B.B. Ramaswamy Gowda, Indian National Congress
 2013: D.Nagarajaiah, Janata Dal (Secular)
 2018: Dr. H. D. Ranganath, Indian National Congress

Election results

2018

See also
 List of constituencies of the Karnataka Legislative Assembly
 Tumkur district

References

Tumkur district
Assembly constituencies of Karnataka